Nicholas Jack Wood (born 9 November 1990, in England) is a footballer playing as a defender.

He made his Football League debut whilst at Tranmere Rovers on 7 August 2010 in the Football League One clash with Oldham Athletic which ended in a 2–1 defeat at Prenton Park.

At the end of the 2010–11 season he was not offered a new contract by the club.
On 11 August 2011, Nick Wood signed a 1-month contract with Mansfield Town FC of the Blue Square Bet Premier, following a successful trial period. However, after making one substitute appearance the club announced on 14 September 2011 that he had been released.

References

External links 
 

1990 births
Living people
People from Ossett
English footballers
Association football defenders
Sheffield Wednesday F.C. players
Sheffield F.C. players
Tranmere Rovers F.C. players
English Football League players
Mansfield Town F.C. players
Footballers from Yorkshire
Ossett Town F.C. players